Critical condition is a medical state.

Critical Condition may also be:
 Critical Condition (SATC episode), an episode of the television series Sex and the City
 Critical Condition (film), a 1987 comedy film

See also
 Condition Critical, a Quiet Riot album
 Condition Critical, an album by White Noise Owl